USS LST-696 was an  built for the United States Navy during World War II. LST-696 was laid down on 25 February 1944 at Jeffersonville, Indiana, by the Jeffersonville Boat & Machine Company; launched 25 April 1944; and commissioned 25 May 1944.

Service history 
During World War II, LST-696 was assigned to the Asiatic-Pacific Theater and earned three battle stars for World War II service.

 Morotai landings, September 1944
 Leyte landings, November 1944
 Lingayen Gulf landings, January 1945

Following the war LST-696 performed occupation duty in the Far East until April 1946. She was decommissioned on 16 July 1946, and struck from the Naval Vessel Register on 28 August 1946. She was sold for scrapping on 19 May 1948, to the Bethlehem Steel Company of Bethlehem, Pennsylvania.

See also
 List of United States Navy LSTs

References

1944 ships
LST-542-class tank landing ships
Ships built in Jeffersonville, Indiana
World War II amphibious warfare vessels of the United States